Gap junction delta-4 protein (GJD4), also known as connexin-40.1 (Cx40.1), is a protein that in humans is encoded by the GJD4 gene.

Function 
Connexins, such as GJD4, are involved in the formation of gap junctions, intercellular conduits that directly connect the cytoplasms of contacting cells. Each gap junction channel is formed by docking of 2 hemichannels, each of which contains 6 connexin subunits.

References

Connexins